Bellesrad (Беллесрад) is short name for the State Institution for Radiation Monitoring and Radiation Safety (Государственное учреждение радиационного контроля и радиационной безопасности «Беллесрад») of the Republic of Belarus. It is subordinated to the State Forestry Committee of the Council of Ministers of Republic of Belarus. It was created to address the impact of the Chernobyl disaster on Belarus.

The institution monitors and investigates radioactive contamination, usage and rehabilitation of vegetation resources. It also controls radioactive contamination of food products.

In particular, Bellesrad posts warning signs and gives safety recommendations about wild plants and animals,  e.g., about mushroom picking. It also oversees the breeding and monitoring of cattle and other agricultural practices in the Polesie State Radioecological Reserve.

See also
Chernobyl disaster effects
List of Chernobyl-related articles

External links
Bellesrad webpage 

Government of Belarus
Science and technology in Belarus
Chernobyl disaster
Aftermath of the Chernobyl disaster